Kissing Couple is a 5,815-foot-elevation (1,772-meter) sandstone pillar located in Colorado National Monument, in Mesa County of western Colorado, United States. It is also a half-mile south-southeast of another popular climbing destination, Independence Monument, and both can be seen from viewpoints along Rim Rock Drive. It is so named because it resembles an embracing couple. This geographical feature's name was officially adopted in 1982 by the United States Board on Geographic Names. Older USGS maps have the feature's name misplaced by about one-half mile to the southeast. The first ascent of the summit was made May 4, 1960, by Layton Kor, Harvey Carter, and John Auld via the five pitch,  route named Long Dong Wall. The first free ascent was made in 1977 by Andy Petefish, Tom Stubbs, and Jim Pearson. Some climbers alternatively refer to Kissing Couple as "Bell Tower."

Geology
This tower is the remnant of a differentially eroded fin composed primarily of cliff-forming Wingate Sandstone, which consists of wind-borne, cross-bedded quartzose sandstones deposited as ancient sand dunes approximately 200 million years ago in the Late Triassic. The thin caprock at the summit consists of fluvial sandstones of the resistant Kayenta Formation. The slope around the base of the Kissing Couple is Chinle Formation. The floor of the canyon is Precambrian basement rock consisting of gneiss, schist, and granites. The tower has a small natural arch which formed from an enlarged vertical joint. Precipitation runoff from this geographical feature drains to the Colorado River, approximately three miles to the northeast.

Climate
According to the Köppen climate classification system, Kissing Couple is located in a semi-arid climate zone. Summers are hot and dry, while winters are cold with some snow. Temperatures reach  on 5.3 days,  on 57 days, and remain at or below freezing on 13 days annually. The months April through October offer the most favorable weather to visit.

Gallery

See also
 List of rock formations in the United States
 Pipe Organ
 Coke Ovens

References

External links
 Weather forecast: National Weather Service
 Kissing Couple rock climbing: Mountainproject.com

Colorado Plateau
Landforms of Mesa County, Colorado
Colorado National Monument
North American 1000 m summits
Sandstone formations of the United States
Rock formations of Colorado
Geologic formations with imbedded sand dunes
Climbing areas of Colorado